Rock glaciers are distinctive geomorphological landforms, consisting either of angular rock debris frozen in interstitial ice, former "true" glaciers overlain by a layer of talus, or something in-between. Rock glaciers are normally found at high latitudes and/or elevations, and may extend outward and downslope from talus cones, glaciers or terminal moraines of glaciers.

There are two types of rock glaciers: periglacial glaciers (or talus-derived glaciers), and glacial rock glaciers, such as the Timpanogos Glacier in Utah, which are often found where glaciers once existed. Possible Martian rock glacier features have been identified by the Mars Orbiter spacecraft. A rock glacier, especially if its origin is unclear, can be considered as a discrete debris accumulation.

Formation

The two known factors that must be present in order to create rock glaciers are low ice velocity and permafrost. Most glacial rock glaciers are created by the recession of debris covered glaciers. Glacial rock glaciers are often found in cirque basins where rocky debris falls off the steep sides and accumulates on ice glaciers. As the glaciers shrink, their composition changes as they become increasingly covered with debris. Eventually, the glacial ice is replaced by ice cored rocks. 

With the exception of ice-cored rock glaciers, rock glaciers are a periglacial process. This means that they are a nonglacial landform associated with cold climates, particularly with various aspects of frozen ground. Periglacial rock glaciers require permafrost instead of glacial ice in order to form. Instead, they are caused by continuous freezing occurring within a talus lobe. Periglacial rock glaciers can form from the alternation of rock debris incoming with autumn firn or avalanche snow. 

Nearby cliffs are in many cases a requirement for the formation of rock glaciers, and as such many rock glaciers form in valleys steepened by glacier erosion. Rock masses of rock glaciers have been found to make up different rock types depending on the local geology. These rock types include andesite, basalt, granite, porphyry, quartzite, and sandstone.

Ordinary glaciers can override rock glaciers, acquiring some of its material and properties. Likewise, rock glaciers can originate from debris-rich remnants of glaciers.

Movement
Rock glaciers move downslope by deformation of the ice contained within them, causing their surface to resemble those of glaciers. Flow features on the surface of rock glaciers may develop from:

 Deformation of the ice core.
 Movement of the debris cover along the debris-ice interface.
 Deformation from a period of glacial advance.
 Changes in the hydrologic balance.
Their growth and formation is subject to some debate, with  main theories:
 A permafrost origin, which implies that the features are related to permafrost action rather than glacial action;
 A mass wasting or landslide origin, which does not require the presence of ice and suggests a sudden catastrophic origin with little subsequent movement.

Rock glaciers may move or creep at a very slow rate, in part dependent on the amount of ice present.

According to recent studies, rock glaciers positively influence the streams around them.

Subject to climate variation, rock glaciers in proximity tend to have a highly synchronous movement pattern over a short time scale; over long term, however, the relationship between rock glacier velocity and climate difference may not be as pronounced, due to the influences of topographic factors and lack of ice or debris budget within the glacier body.

Human use
Rock glaciers in the Chilean Andes help supply the water for much of Chile, including the capital of Santiago. Mining operations in the high mountains have led to the degradation and destruction of more than two rock glaciers. Several copper mines dump their waste rock onto rock glaciers, which results in faster melting and higher velocity movement of these rock glaciers. The dumping of waste rock on the rock glaciers may lead to their destabilization. In 2004, protesting irrigation farmers and environmentalists changed rules so new mining projects can no longer damage or alter rock glaciers in Chile.

Parts of the only road into Denali National Park and Preserve in Alaska are built on a rock glacier known as "Pretty Rocks".

References

External links 
Earth Observatory image and explanation of a rock glacier on Sourdough Peak, Alaska
USGS Glossary of Glacier Terminology
AGU - Terrestrial Models of Rock Glacier and Protalus Lobe Formation 

Glaciology
Periglacial landforms
Permafrost